Jacob Turney (February 18, 1825 – October 4, 1891) was an American lawyer and politician from Pennsylvania who served as a Democratic member of the U.S. House of Representatives for Pennsylvania's 21st congressional district from 1875 to 1879.  He also served as a member of the Pennsylvania Senate for the 22nd district from 1858 to 1860.

Early life and education
Turney was born in Greensburg, Pennsylvania to Dutch immigrants Jacob, Sr. and Margaret (Singer) Turney.  He completed preparatory studies and attended Greensburg Academy.  He apprenticed as a printer and worked as a deputy sheriff and clerk in the register and recorder's office.  He studied law under Albert Marchand, was admitted to the bar in 1849 and commenced practice in Greensburg.

Career
He served as district attorney for Westmoreland County, Pennsylvania, from 1850 to 1855.  He gained prominence through the successful prosecution of several high profile murder trials.  He was a presidential elector in 1856 and cast his vote for James Buchanan.  He was a member of the Pennsylvania State Senate for the 22nd district from 1858 to 1860 and was elected president in 1859.  He was an unsuccessful candidate for State Senator in 1871.

Turney was elected as a Democrat to the Forty-fourth and Forty-fifth Congresses.  He served on the Privileges and Elections, Mines, Territories and Currencies Committees.  He played a key role in the passage of the Bland-Allison Act which reintroduced the legality of silver currency.  After leaving Congress, he resumed the practice of law. 
He died in Greensburg in 1891 and was interred in St. Clair Cemetery.

Footnotes

Sources

The Political Graveyard

|-

1825 births
1891 deaths
19th-century American lawyers
19th-century American politicians
American lawyers admitted to the practice of law by reading law
Burials in Pennsylvania
County district attorneys in Pennsylvania
Democratic Party members of the United States House of Representatives from Pennsylvania
Pennsylvania lawyers
Democratic Party Pennsylvania state senators
People from Greensburg, Pennsylvania
Presidents pro tempore of the Pennsylvania Senate